Tick Creek is a tributary of the Gasconade River in northwestern Phelps County in the Ozarks of Missouri.

Tick Creek most likely was so named due to the reported abundance of ticks in the area.

See also
List of rivers of Missouri

References

Rivers of Phelps County, Missouri
Rivers of Missouri
Tributaries of the Gasconade River